The form factor of a mobile phone is its size, shape, and style, as well as the layout and position of its major components.

With one non-movable section

Bar
A bar (also known as a slab, block, candybar) phone takes the shape of a cuboid, usually with rounded corners and/or edges. The name is derived from the rough resemblance to a chocolate bar in size and shape. This form factor is widely used by a variety of manufacturers, such as Nokia and Sony Ericsson. Bar-type smartphones commonly have the screen and keypad on a single face. Sony had a well-known 'Mars Bar' phone model CM-H333 in 1993 that was longer and thinner than the typical bar phone. Bar phones without a full keyboard tend to have a 3×4 numerical keypad; text is often generated on such systems using the Text on 9 keys algorithm.

Keyboard bars
These are variants of bars that have a full QWERTY keyboard on the front. While they are technically the same as a regular bar phone, the keyboard and all the buttons make them look significantly different. Devices like these were popular in the mid to late 2000s, but lost popularity afterward. The BlackBerry line from Research In Motion (RIM) was particularly popular and influential in this category.

Brick
"Brick" is a slang term used to refer to large, outdated rectangular phones, typically early devices with large batteries and electronics. These early phones, such as the Motorola DynaTAC, have been displaced by newer smaller models which offer greater portability thanks to smaller antennas and slimmer battery packs.

However, "brick" has more recently been applied to older phone models in general, including non-bar form factors (flip, slider, swivel, etc.), and even early touchscreen phones as well, due to their size and relative lack of functionality compared to current models on the market.

The term "brick" has also expanded beyond smartphones to include most non-working consumer electronics, including a game console, router, or other device, that, due to a serious misconfiguration, corrupted firmware, or a hardware problem, can no longer function, hence, is as technologically useful as a brick. The term derives from the vaguely cuboid shape of many electronic devices (and their detachable power supplies) and the suggestion that the device can function only as a lifeless, square object, paperweight or doorstop. This term is commonly used as a verb. For example, "I bricked my MP3 player when I tried to modify its firmware." It can also be used as a noun, for example, "If it's corrupted and you apply using fastboot, your device is a brick." In the common usage of the term, "bricking" suggests that the damage is so serious as to have rendered the device permanently unusable.

Slate
A slate is a smartphone form with few to no physical buttons, instead relying upon a touchscreen and an onscreen virtual keyboard for input.  The first commercially available touchscreen phone was a brick phone, the IBM Simon Personal Communicator, released in 1994.  The iPhone, which was released by Apple in 2007, is largely responsible for the influence and achievement of this design as it is currently conceived.

Some unusual "slate" designs include that of LG New Chocolate (BL40), or the Samsung Galaxy Round, which is curved.

Phablet

The phablet or smartlet is a subset of the slate/touchscreen. A portmanteau of the words phone and tablet, phablets are a class of mobile device designed to combine or straddle the size of a slate smartphone together with a tablet. Phablets typically have screens that measure (diagonally) greater than 5.3 inches, and are considerably larger than most high-end slate smartphones of the time (i.e. the Samsung Galaxy Note II smartlet versus the Samsung Galaxy SIII smartphone), which have to be 5.2 inches or less to be known as a smartphone, though significantly smaller than tablets (which must be 7 inches or above to be considered as such).

Multi-screen
The multi-screen is of basically the slate form factor, but with two touchscreens.

Some have a small separate screen above the main screens, the LG V10 and LG V20.

Other multi-screen form factors has screens on both sides of the phone. In the case of Yotaphone and Siam 7X, they have normal touchscreens on the front, but on the backside is an e-ink screen, which enables using the cases in a fashion similar to reading a book.

The presence of the front camera for taking selfies has been an essential feature in smartphones, however, it is a difficulty to achieve a bezelless screen as is the trend in the later 2010s. The Nubia X, Nubia Z20 and Vivo NEX Dual Display have solved this combining the use of the main camera and a smaller second rear screen, eliminating the front camera.

Wrapped-around display 
Xiaomi revealed Mi MIX Alpha, a smartphone with a display that surrounds almost entirely its body, only interrupted in the back part by a column that contains the cameras. Back part of display can be used as viewfinder for selfies and videocalls.

Taco
The taco form factor was popularized by the Nokia N-Gage, released in 2003. It was widely known as the plastic taco for its taco-shape and the placement of microphones on the side of the device, which, when one talks into the microphone, gives the appearance of eating a taco. Other models include Nokia 3300 and Nokia 5510.

Wearables

Smartwatch

A smartphone in the form of a wristwatch is typically referred to as a smartwatch or watch phone.

With movable sections

Flip

A flip or clamshell phone consists of two or more sections that are connected by hinges, allowing the phone to flip open then fold closed in order to become more compact. When flipped open, the phone's screen and keyboard are available. When flipped shut, the phone becomes much smaller and more portable than when it is opened for use.

Motorola was once owner of a trademark for the term flip phone, but the term flip phone has become genericized and used more frequently than clamshell in colloquial speech. Motorola was the manufacturer of the famed StarTAC flip phone in the 1990s, as well as the RAZR in the mid-2000s. There were also flip "down" phones, like the Motorola MicroTAC series and was also widely used by Ericsson.

In 2010, Motorola introduced a different kind of flip phone with its Backflip smartphone. When closed, one side is the screen and the other is a physical QWERTY keyboard. The hinge is on a long edge of the phone instead of a short edge, and when flipped out the screen is above the keyboard.

Another unusual flip form was seen on the luxury Serene, a partnership between Samsung and Bang & Olufsen.

Clamshell came to be used as generic for this form factor. Flip phone referred to phones that opened on the vertical axis. As clamshells disappeared from the market, the terms again became disambiguated.

By the mid-2000s, "flip" designs reached the peak of their availability and declined afterward, being replaced by sliders which in turn were completely replaced by slate smartphones.

Dual-touchscreen

In April 2011, Kyocera International released the Kyocera Echo smartphone with two 3.5" screens. The phone's primary display could lie on top of the second display, reducing its size. In November 2017, ZTE announced the Axon M. The screens could fold to either have two forward facing screens, or one forward and one rear facing screen. The combined display size is 6.75-inch when unfolded. The second screen allows the Axon M's single camera to be both rear and forward facing, as well as acting as a kickstand or tripod.

Foldable screen

Following advances in display technology, OLED screens can now be manufactured on a flexible, plastic substrate, meaning that glass is no longer needed; allowing the displays to be rolled, bent and folded; which makes new form factors possible. In January 2017, rumors emerged of a Samsung foldable phone, and in November 2018, the Samsung Galaxy Fold was revealed, with a combined display size of 7.4 inches. Other manufacturers, such as Huawei and Xiaomi, have also announced phones with foldable displays.
In November 2019, Motorola officially unveiled its horizontal-folding Motorola Razr.

Flip-up camera 

The Oppo N1 made use of a manual flip camera. Asus, in the Zenfone 6, Zenfone 7 and Zenfone 8 Flip smartphones, includes an all-screen front, eliminating the dedicated front-facing camera notch; instead, the main cameras are housed in a motorized flip-up module that rotates 180 degrees to focus forward. The Samsung Galaxy A80 also has a similar flip-slide camera mechanism.

Slider
A slider is composed of usually two, but sometimes more, sections that slide past each other on rails. Most slider phones have a display segment which houses the device's screen, while another segment contains the keypad or keyboard and slides out for use. The goal of a sliding form factor is to allow the operator to take advantage of full physical keyboards or keypads, without sacrificing portability, by retracting them into the phone when they are not in use. Many different companies have developed smartphones that slide: Samsung has the Corby and BlackBerry has the Torch.

The Siemens SL10 was one of the first slider smartphones in 1999. Some phones have an automatic slider built in that deploys the keypad. Many phones pop out their keypad segments as soon as the user begins to slide the phone apart. Unique models are the 2-way slider where sliding up or down provides distinct functions: the Nokia N85 or Nokia N95 are examples of this.

A version of the slider form factor, the side slider or QWERTY slider, uses vertical access of the keyboard on the bottom segment. The side slider form factor is primarily used to facilitate faster access to the keyboard with both thumbs. The Motorola Photon Q, Danger Hiptop, Sony Mylo, and HTC Touch Pro are four primary examples.

Some unusual sliders have also been made, such as the Nokia 7280 modeled like lipstick, Samsung SGH-F520 from 2007 which slides three ways with a QWERTY keyboard, and the Samsung Anycall SCH-B550; which is a gaming phone.

Sliders supplanted the flip form, since they allowed manufacturers to pack more keypad buttons and features (especially the side slider or QWERTY slider) into the same form factor, while touchscreen interfaces were still in their infancy. By the late-2000s, "slider" designs reached the peak of their popularity and declined afterward, being completely replaced by slate form factors with well-developed touch interfaces. In 2015, BlackBerry Limited (previously RIM) released the BlackBerry Priv, the first mainstream slider phone in several years (based on Android, not the Blackberry operating system they sold so far).

Nokia E7, released in 2011 and F(x)tec Pro 1, released in 2019 are notable examples of smartphone sliders as they bring out the keyboard from the side and tilt the display so they reminisce a laptop.

Today, manufacturers are trying to develop bezel-less smartphones; the greatest difficulty being the presence of front-facing cameras and face recognition sensors. While most brands expand display real-estate, some depart from that approach, returning to the slider form factor; like the Xiaomi Mi Mix 3, Huawei Honor Magic 2 and Lenovo Z5 Pro.

A variation of this design is the kick-slider, a slider with an extra hinge to conform to face like on Motorola Rizr Z8.

Pop up camera 
Phones like Oppo Find X and Vivo Nex hide front cameras within the body of the devices in motorized pop-up modules to create a bezelless front face fully occupied by screens without any cutout while keeping a front-facing camera that can up when required. Vivo V15 Pro  and Centric S1  also come with a pop-up front-facing camera mechanism.

Swivel
A swivel phone is composed of multiple—usually two—segments, which swivel past each other about a sagittal axis (most of the time). Use of the swiveling form factor has similar goals to that of the slider, but this form factor is less widely used. Samples are, LG U900 + 960 + V9000, Motorola Flipout + V70 + V80, Nokia 7370, Siemens SK65, Samsung Juke + Samsung SGH-X830, and Sony Ericsson S700i + W600. The LG Wing implemented this feature into a slate design smartphone, with two touchscreens.

Other examples include the Sierra Wireless Voq which combines a candybar with a keyboard "side-flip"; the Nokia Communicator series which utilise both a candybar and a clamshell with a QWERTY keyboard; or the Siemens SK65 which is a swivel candybar with a QWERTY keyboard.

Bezelless Samsung A80 only has rear cameras that are housed in a motorized module, using a combination of slider and swivel they achieve the rotation to the front to be used for selfies.

No sagital axis
Some implementations, that do not use the sagital axis, are presenting in phones like Nokia 3250 and Oppo N1, with twistable components: a keyboard, and main camera (doubling as a selfie one), respectively.

Some mobile phones use more than one form, such as the Nokia N90, Nokia 6260, Philips 968, Sharp SX862, Samsung SGH-P910, Samsung FlipShot SCH-U900, Amoi 2560, Samsung Alias series or Panasonic FOMA P900iV, which use both a swivel and a flip axis.

Other examples include the Sierra Wireless Voq which combines a candybar with a keyboard "side-flip"; the Nokia Communicator series which utilise both a candybar and a clamshell with a QWERTY keyboard; or the Siemens SK65 which is a swivel candybar with a QWERTY keyboard.

Rear cameras only
Bezelless Samsung A80 only has rear cameras that are housed in a motorized module, using a combination of slider and swivel they achieve the rotation to the front to be used for selfies.

References

External links
 Many illustrations of standard and mixed form factors
 HTC Wallaby specification

Industrial design
Mobile phones